The Ngwavuma is a river in Eswatini and KwaZulu-Natal Province in southern Africa. It is also known as the Inguavuma, Ingwavuma, Ingwovuma, and Nggwavuma, and is one of the five major rivers in Eswatini. It arises in southwestern Eswatini and flows eastward. It is a tributary of the Pongola River.

The principal towns in Eswatini along the Ngwavuma are Nhlangano and Nsoko.

Notes

External links
 Ngwavuma River, Swaziland - Satellite View centered on the mouth of the river in KwaZulu-Natal from satelliteviews.net

Rivers of KwaZulu-Natal